29 Regiment RLC is a regiment of the Royal Logistic Corps of the British Army.

Structure
The regiment's current structure is as follows:
55 Headquarters Squadron
50 Postal Courier and Movement Control Squadron
59 Postal Courier and Movement Control Squadron
69 Postal Courier and Movement Control Squadron
80 Postal Courier and Movement Control Squadron
99 Postal Courier and Movement Control Squadron

The regiment is paired with the reserve 162 Regiment RLC for training and operations.

References

Regiments of the Royal Logistic Corps
Military units and formations established in 1993